TW Pictoris is a 14th magnitude cataclysmic variable star system in the southern constellation of Pictor. It is located at a distance of approximately 1,430 light-years based on parallax measurements. Photometric observations in the visual band suggest a binary system with an orbital period of 6.06 hours. One of the components is an accreting white dwarf.

The X-ray source H0534-581 was identified from the data collected by the HEAO 1 satellite in 1979. In 1984, a candidate optical counterpart was identified by I. R. Tuohy and associates from photographs taken at the Schmidt telescope. A low-resolution spectrum revealed this is a cataclysmic variable, and it was assigned the variable star designation TW Pictoris. It was initially proposed to be an intermediate polar, but the lack of an X-ray pulsation makes this less likely. The current classification remains controversial.

References 

Cataclysmic variable stars
Pictor (constellation)
Pictoris, TW